Renato Ruíz Cortes (born May 9, 1977) is a Mexican professional wrestler better known by the ring name Averno (Hell). Ruíz initially worked for Consejo Mundial de Lucha Libre (CMLL) as Rencor Latino in 1995, but did not achieve any significant success until he adopted the ring name Averno in June 2001. Under his new ring name, Ruíz went on to become a one–time CMLL World Middleweight, CMLL World Trios Champion, NWA World Middleweight Champion and NWA World Historic Middleweight Champion and a three–time CMLL World Tag Team Champion. His ring name is most commonly translated as "Hell" in English.

For many years Averno's real name was not a matter of public record, as is often the case with masked wrestlers in Mexico where their private lives are kept a secret from the wrestling fans. However, in May 2011, Averno was booked in a Lucha de Apuesta, where he lost his mask and was forced to reveal his true identity. Ruíz left CMLL in April 2014 and joined rival promotion Lucha Libre AAA Worldwide (AAA) the following month.

Personal life
Renato Ruíz Cortes was born on May 9, 1977 in Mexico City, Mexico, son of then-professional wrestler Rodolfo Ruíz. He began training for a professional wrestling career himself at a young age, training under his father, who by then had retired from in-ring competition and instead was working as a referee and trainer. He made his in-ring debut in 1995, around his eighteenth birthday.

Professional wrestling career

Consejo Mundial de Lucha Libre (1995-2014)

Rencor Latino (1995–2001)
Ruíz began wrestling in 1995 under the ring name Rencor Latino (Latin Hostility). Working as Rencor Latino he soon started working in the lower ranks of Consejo Mundial de Lucha Libre (CMLL; "World Wrestling Council"). He won his first Lucha de Apuestas, or "bet match", 1998 unmasking Apolo Chino by defeating him after a midcard feud. On August 4, 2002 Rencor Latino was one of twelve wrestlers putting their mask on the line during CMLL's Entre Torre Infernal ("In the Infernal Tower") pay-per-view. The match came down to Rencor Latino and veteran wrestler El Hijo del Gladiador, and ended with Rencor Latino winning the match, taking El Hijo del Gladiador's mask in the process. He continued wrestling in the midcard until he was recruited by El Satánico in the summer of 2001 to be part of a new Los Infernales ("The Infernal Ones") group.

Averno (2001–2014)

During a televised segment Satánico used his supposed "satanic powers" to turn técnico (good guy) Rencor Latino into one of his "minions", a rudo (bad guy) character known as "Averno" ("Hell"). Traditionally when a masked wrestler transitions from one identity to a new identity it is not publicly acknowledged, but in Ruíz' case it was actually part of the storyline. As a result of the transition Averno would on occasion wrestle wearing a special mask that was half Averno, half Rencor Latino. Satánico and Averno were joined by Mephisto who had previously wrestled as Astro Rey Jr. The trio feuded with Último Guerrero, Rey Bucanero, and Tarzan Boy throughout the year with Averno and El Satánico unsuccessfully challenging Guerrero and Bucanero for the CMLL World Tag Team Championship in August 2001. The team lost when Satánico was disqualified for using a low blow. When Tarzan Boy was injured and unable to wrestle Bucanero and Guerrero recruited Máscara Mágica to even the numbers. The storyline between the two factions reaches its high point at the CMLL 68th Anniversary Show where all seven wrestlers faced off in a steel cage match. The stipulation of the match was that the winning side would gain the rights to use the name Los Infernales while the loser on the opposite side would be forced to unmask or have their hair shaved off. In the end El Satánico pinned Máscara Mágica, forcing him to unmask. After losing the match Guerrero, Bucanero and Tarzan Boy became known collectively as Los Guerreros del Infierno (The Infernal Soldiers), while El Satánico, Averno and Mephisto continuing to work as Los Infernales.

In 2002, Los Infernales won the Mexican National Trios Championship in Guadalajara, Jalisco and began feuding with La Familia de Tijuana (Nicho el Millonario, Halloween, and Damián 666). The trio lost the championship to La Familia in September 2002 but continued feuding with the group into 2003. Over the summer of 2003 Los Infernales won a tournament to become the number one contenders for the CMLL World Trios Championship but lost champions Black Tiger III, Dr. Wagner Jr., and Universo 2000 on August 1. At the end of the year, Averno and Mephisto turned on El Satánico, but there was no major storyline feud between the three afterwards. In September 2004, Averno defeated Zumbido to win the vacant NWA World Middleweight Championship. Shortly after the championship win Averno was positioned as a rival or foil to the up-and-coming tecnico Místico. Averno and Mephisto also became de facto members of Los Guerreros del Infierno, joining forces with their former rivals. In February 2005, Averno lost the NWA World Middleweight Championship to Místico as part of their long running storyline. Two months later Averno and Mephisto defeated Atlantis and Blue Panther to win the CMLL World Tag Team Championship. When Shinsuke Nakamura and Hiroshi Tanahashi from New Japan Pro-Wrestling came to CMLL, Averno initially teamed up with them, the two turned on him. This led to a trios match with Averno, Último Guerrero and Rey Bucanero defeating Nakamura, Tanahashi, and Shigeo Okumura in one of the featured bouts on the CMLL 72nd Anniversary Show. In early 2006 Averno and Mephisto were the catalyst for one of CMLL's big storylines as they defended their titles against Místico and Black Warrior twice. In the first match, they won by disqualification when Black Warrior interfered in the match after already being eliminated and in the second match Black Warrior turned on Místico, attacking his partner to end the match. In April 2006, they lost the tag team championship to Místico and Negro Casas, ending their 377-day-long reign.

In 2008 Averno formed the group Los Hijos del Averno ("The Sons of Hell") alongside Mephisto and Ephesto, followed by Averno and Mephisto defeating Atlantis and Último Guerrero to win the CMLL World Tag Team Championship for a second time. On September 17, 2008 Averno defeated Negro Casas to win the CMLL World Middleweight Championship, becoming a double middleweight champion as he still held the NWA World Middleweight Championship. Their reign lasted only 38 days before Místico and Héctor Garza won the championship from them. The duo became three-time tag team champions by the end of the year as Averno and Mephisto defeated Místico and Garza on December 7, 2008. The duo's third run with the CMLL World Tag Teams Championship ended on January 16, 2009 when they lost to La Sombra and Volador Jr. On July 22, Averno lost one of his middleweight championships, the CMLL World Middleweight Championship, to Hijo del Fantasma. On July 12, 2010, at the Promociones Gutiérrez 1st Anniversary Show Averno participated in a match where 10 men put their mask on the line in a match that featured five pareja incredibles teams, with the losing team being forced to wrestle each other with their mask on the line. His partner in the match was Último Guerrero, facing off against the teams of Atlantis and Olímpico, Místico and El Oriental, Histeria and La Sombra, Volado Jr. and El Alebrije. Averno and Último Guerrero was the third team to escape the match. In mid 2010 CMLL abandoned the NWA World Middleweight Championship after repeated complaints from the National Wrestling Alliance, instead they created the NWA World Historic Middleweight Championship and made Averno the first champion. Averno was one of 14 men putting their masks on the line in a Lucha de Apuestas steel cage match, the main event of the CMLL 77th Anniversary Show. Averno was the first man to leave the steel cage with all three members of Los Hijos del Averno quickly leaving the cage, keeping their masks safe.

In April 2011, Averno began feuding with La Máscara, building a storyline that led to a Mask vs. Mask Lucha de Apuesta on June 17. The match announcement came on the heels of a report that Averno had signed a contract with WWE, supposedly following long time in-ring rival Místico who had already signed with WWE. On June 17 at CMLL's Juicio Final ("Final Judgement") show, Averno was defeated by La Máscara two falls to one and thus was forced to unmask. Upon unmasking, Averno revealed that his real name was Renato Ruíz Cortes, that he was 34 years old originally from Mexico City and had been wrestling for 16 years. Afterward, Ruíz and La Máscara continued their rivalry, building up to another singles match on July 4, where Ruíz successfully defended the NWA World Historic Middleweight Championship. Despite rumors Averno never began working for WWE, opting at the time to stay with CMLL. On July 15, Los Hijos del Averno defeated La Generación Dorada (La Máscara, Máscara Dorada and La Sombra) to win the CMLL World Trios Championship. On September 9, 2011 Averno entered CMLL's annual tournament of champions, the Universal Championship tournament. After defeating CMLL World Super Lightweight Champion Virus and old rival, Mexican National Light Heavyweight Champion La Máscara, in his first two matches, Averno defeated CMLL World Tag Team Champion Último Guerrero in the semi-finals. On September 16, Averno was defeated in the Universal Championship finals by La Sombra. On November 22, Averno lost the NWA World Historic Middleweight Championship to La Máscara.

On February 19, 2012, Los Hijos del Averno lost the CMLL World Trios Championship to El Bufete del Amor ("The Law of Love"; Marco Corleone, Máximo, and Rush). Averno was forced to team up with constant rival La Mascara, for the 2013 Torneo Nacional de Parejas Increibles, just like he was for the 2012 tournament. The team worked together without too many problems in the first round as they defeated the team of El Hijo de Fantasma and El Felino, but stumbled in the second round as they lost to eventual tournament winners La Sombra and Volador Jr. On April 26, 2013, at the Arena Mexico 57th Anniversary Show Averno defeated Místico La Nueva Era to win the vacant Mexican National Welterweight Championship. On September 13 at CMLL's 80th Anniversary Show, Averno defeated Blue Panther in a submission only Lucha de Apuestas match, which forced Blue Panther to have all his hair shaved off as a result. On December 1, Averno lost the Mexican National Welterweight Championship to Titán. On April 28, 2014, CMLL announced that Averno had parted ways with the company.

Total Nonstop Action Wrestling (2008)
In 2008 Total Nonstop Action Wrestling (TNA) invited Averno, along with Volador Jr.,Último Guerrero and Rey Bucanero to compete in the 2008 TNA World X Cup Tournament, making them that year's "Team Mexico" entrants, with Guerrero serving as the team captain. Averno only wrestled one match in the tournament, participating in a twelve-man three tag team elimination match, at the Victory Road pay-per-view. Averno was the fourth man eliminated from the match at the hands of Team Japan's Masato Yoshino. Later during the same show Volador Jr. won an Ultimate X match, earning enough points for Team Mexico to win the entire tournament, becoming the 2008 World X Cup holders. Volador Jr. would work more matches for TNA, but Averno, Último Guerrero and Rey Bucanero did not.

Lucha Libre AAA Worldwide (2014–2021)

On May 17, 2014, Averno made his debut for Lucha Libre AAA Worldwide (AAA), joining the rudo stable La Sociedad. In a main event six-man tag team match, Averno teamed with Chessman and Pentagón Jr. to defeat Cibernético, Fénix and Psycho Clown, pinning Fénix for the win. After the match, Averno was attacked by an unnamed "mysterious wrestler", portrayed by his old rival Místico. On September 26, Averno and Chessman came together with Cibernético to reform the Los Hell Brothers stable, with Averno replacing former member Charly Manson for this incarnation of Los Hell Brothers. In February 2015, Los Hell Brothers officially joined La Sociedad. On June 14, 2015, at Verano de Escándalo, Averno won his first title in AAA, when Los Hell Brothers captured the AAA World Trios Championship. At Triplemanía  XXIII Los Hell Brothers successfully defended the AAA World Trios Championship in a Steel Cage match, defeating the trios of Fénix and Los Güeros del Cielo (Angélico and Jack Evans) and Los Perros del Mal (El Hijo del Fantasma, Pentagón Jr., El Texano Jr.) In late 2015 Cibernético left AAA, which forced AAA to strip Los Hell Brothers the trios championship on January 6, 2016. On January 22 at Guerra de Titanes, Averno and Chessman won the vacant AAA World Tag Team Championship. However, immediately afterwards, La Sociedad turned on the two and expelled them from the group. Los Hell Brothers subsequently made several successful title defenses and began bragging about how there were no challengers left for them to deal with, that "no man" could defeat them. In the spring of 2016 sisters-turned-rivals Mari Apache and Faby Apache reunited as Mari returned to the tecnico side and started to team up with her sister on a regular basis. At that point in time the Apaches challenged Los Hell Brothers, demanding that they put the tag team championship on the line, a challenge that Averno and Chessman turned down, acting very dismissing and sexist in the process. During the July 8 AAA Television taping Averno and Chessman dressed up as a pair of frumpy women as they mocked Los Apaches. At the subsequent taping Los Apaches distracted Averno and Chessman during a title defense against Jack Evans and Angélico, which lead to Averno and Chessman losing the tag team championship. Afterwards it was announced that Averno and Chessman had finally agree to face Los Apaches at Triplemanía XXIV. The match at Triplemanía XXIV ended in a no-contest after Chessman and Averno hit the Apaches with fluorescent light tubes, causing Gran Apache to come to their aid. Averno and Chessman then paired up with Ricky Marvin to form a new trio named OGT, winning the AAA World Trios Championship on November 4. They lost the title to El Apache, Faby Apache and Mary Apache on March 5, 2017, when Marvin was defeated by Faby in a singles match.

Championships and accomplishments
Consejo Mundial de Lucha Libre
CMLL World Middleweight Championship (1 time)
CMLL World Tag Team Championship (3 times) – with Mephisto
CMLL World Trios Championship (1 time) – with Ephesto and Mephisto
Mexican National Trios Championship (1 time) – with Satánico and Mephisto
Mexican National Welterweight Championship (1 time)
NWA World Middleweight Championship (1 time)
NWA World Historic Middleweight Championship (1 time, inaugural)
Lucha Libre AAA Worldwide
 AAA World Tag Team Championship (1 time) – with Chessman
AAA World Trios Championship (3 times) – with Cibernético and Chessman (1), Chessman and Ricky Marvin (1), and Chessman and Super Fly (1)
Pro Wrestling Illustrated
PWI ranked him 48 of the 500 best singles wrestlers of the PWI 500 in 2006
Total Nonstop Action Wrestling
TNA World X Cup (2008) – with Rey Bucanero, Último Guerrero and Volador Jr.
World Wrestling Association
WWA Middleweight Championship (1 time, current)

Luchas de Apuestas record

Footnotes

References

1977 births
20th-century professional wrestlers
21st-century professional wrestlers
Living people
Mexican male professional wrestlers
Masked wrestlers
Professional wrestlers from Mexico City
AAA World Trios Champions
AAA World Tag Team Champions
Mexican National Trios Champions
CMLL World Middleweight Champions
CMLL World Tag Team Champions
CMLL World Trios Champions
NWA World Historic Middleweight Champions
NWA World Middleweight Champions